Likoma apicalis is a moth of the family Sphingidae. It is known from savanna and open woodland in the Democratic Republic of the Congo, Zambia, Malawi, Tanzania and Kenya.

The length of the forewings is 26–30 mm for males and about 34 mm for females. The forewings are long and narrow. The ground colour is pinkish brown to olive brown. The transverse lines of the forewing are fairly straight. The outer marginal area of the forewing, tornus of the hindwing and first abdominal tergite are chocolate in colour. There is a chocolate-coloured spot at the inner margin near the tornus.

References

Smerinthini
Moths described in 1903
Moths of Africa